The 2012 Arimex ATP Challenger Trophy was a professional tennis tournament played on clay courts. It was the sixth edition of the tournament which was part of the 2012 ATP Challenger Tour. It took place in Trnava, Slovakia between 17 and 23 September 2012.

Singles main draw entrants

Seeds

 1 Rankings are as of September 10, 2012.

Other entrants
The following players received wildcards into the singles main draw:
  Norbert Gomboš
  Robin Kern
  Nicolas Reissig
  Adrian Sikora

The following players received entry as a special exempt into the singles main draw:
  Jason Kubler
  Nikola Mektić

The following players received entry from the qualifying draw:
  Steven Diez
  Dušan Lojda
  Stéphane Robert
  Walter Trusendi

Champions

Singles

 Andrey Kuznetsov def.  Adrian Ungur, 6–3, 6–3

Doubles

 Nikola Ćirić /  Goran Tošić def.  Mate Pavić /  Franko Škugor, 7–6(7–0), 7–5

External links
Official Website

ATP Challenger Trophy
 
2012 in Slovak tennis
STRABAG Challenger Open